WARA (1320 AM) is a radio station in Attleboro, Massachusetts. Its transmitter is located in North Attleborough, Massachusetts. The station is owned by Attleboro Access Cable Systems.

History

1950s

1950
WARA first signed on October 8, 1950.  It was the local Attleboro radio station from then until 1998.  Its original power was 1 kW. WARA had the callsign WIRD assigned to it until it changed to WARA on March 29, 1950.

1980s

Early-Mid 1980s

1985-1987: power increase
WARA's owners applied for a power increase to its currently-authorized 5 kW day & night on September 24, 1985 (BP-19850924AF).  The F.C.C. granted the increase on April Fools' Day 1986 with a license to cover being issued on September 25, 1987.  Additionally, WARA changed ownership from Jerome Ottmar to James H., Peter H. & David J. Ottmar in 1986.

1990s

1995
WARA is talk radio as "Talk 1320" by this time.  It is owned by Peter Ottmar's Back Bay Broadcasting, along with WPNW, WWKX & WBNW.

On July 31, 1995, WARA, now owned by Dr.Michele E. Merolla of Fairhaven Ma.,  began syndicating Coast to Coast AM hosted by Art Bell. Art held the East of the Rockies line open in the final half-hour of the show to take calls from WARA listeners.

1998
WARA became Spanish-language WJYT.  ADD Radio Group bought the station effective June 1.

2000s

2000–2002
WJYT changed calls to WARL on December 6, 2000.  As WARL, it has had many formats, which are detailed below.  The first of these formats was "Web Access Radio Live"- a brokered time/internet T.V. hybrid. By this time, the station shifted its focus to the nearby Providence, Rhode Island area, even though it cannot be received well in parts of Providence.

2002–2003
WARL became easy listening with Norm Jagolinzer as host.  Later that year the format changed from easy listening to urban as "Power 1320".

2003–2004
WARL changed formats again to all-conspiracy talk "Reality Radio 1320" (featuring programming from Genesis Communications Network).  The programming had been airing on WALE until its bankruptcy sale in May 2003.

2004–2006
WARL's format once again changes, this time to sports talk "1320 The Drive" programmed by Scott MacPherson as a companion to his Sports Journal newspaper. WARL was the Providence-area affiliate of Sporting News Radio from 2004–2006.  It was the flagship station for the Providence Bruins Radio Network for the 2005–06 season.

2006–2009
 
In September 2006 WARL changed again to new-age "Positive Energy Moving Forward."  It dropped sports programming during this time.

2009
WARL added Boston College Eagles sports as well as Attleboro High School football.

2010s

2010
In May 2010, Jeff Santos, who bought time on WWZN in Boston to air progressive talk, announced on his show that they were buying time on WARL as well, in full force by May 31, 2010.  Santos' show went off WARL in 2012.

2013
On May 6, 2013, WARL leased out much of its morning schedule (from 6 a.m. to noon) Mondays through Saturdays to Southeastern Massachusetts Broadcasting, which uses the time for talk shows and a radio classifieds program; these programs, branded SoMa 1320, are directed toward Bristol County, as opposed to the entire Providence market. The programming began as a six-month trial period.

2014

On April 13, 2014, WARL changed its call sign to WRNP.

2015
On March 20, 2015, the ADD Radio Group agreed to donate the WRNP license to Attleboro Access Cable Systems, which will convert the station to noncommercial operation. The new owners changed the station's callsign back to WARA; the WRNP callsign was not included in the donation. The donation was completed on May 5, 2015, with the return of the WARA call sign following the next day.

FCC issues
According to a filing with the FCC in early 2007, the station's transmitter facility was substantially damaged by vandals.  The owner asserted that they were unable to return the station to its licensed daytime power, even with four radio engineers and support from the transmitter equipment manufacturer.  In April 2008, the FCC dismissed their request to extend the temporary authority to remain at reduced power.

See also
List of community radio stations in the United States

References

External links

IDs on Bostonradio.org include a 1995 WARA ID as "Talk 1320" & WARL from 2008
WARA mention on WEZE's history page showing ownership structure in 1995
WARA logo from the 1990s on this page

ARA
Radio stations established in 1950
W
Mass media in Bristol County, Massachusetts
Community radio stations in the United States